Zacconi is an Italian surname. Notable people with the surname include:

 Ermete Zacconi (1857–1948), Italian stage and film actor
 Giuseppe Zacconi (1910–1970), Italian director
 Lodovico Zacconi (1555–1627), Italian-Austrian composer and musical theorist

Italian-language surnames